Dinalaye is a town in the Liptougou Department of Gnagna Province in eastern Burkina Faso. The town has a population of 3,197.

References

Populated places in the Est Region (Burkina Faso)
Gnagna Province